Bradina atopalis is a moth of the family Crambidae described by Francis Walker in 1858. It is found in China, Taiwan, Japan, Korea and Russia.

References

Moths described in 1858
Bradina
Moths of Japan